Volvarina sauliae is a species of sea snail, a marine gastropod mollusk in the family Marginellidae, the margin snails.

Description

Distribution
This species occurs in the Atlantic Ocean off Cape Verde.

References

 Moreno D. & Burnay L.P. (1999) The genus Volvarina (Gastropoda: Marginellidae) in the Cape Verde Islands. Journal of Conchology 36(5): 83-124. 
 Rolán E., 2005. Malacological Fauna From The Cape Verde Archipelago. Part 1, Polyplacophora and Gastropoda.
 Cossignani T. (2006). Marginellidae & Cystiscidae of the World. L'Informatore Piceno. 408pp.
 Moreno D. 2012. The genus Gibberula (Gastropoda, Cystiscidae) in the Cape Verde Islands with the description of a new species. Iberus, 30(1): 67–83.

External links

Marginellidae
Gastropods of Cape Verde
Gastropods described in 1846